Eucalyptus chapmaniana,  commonly known as the Bogong gum, is a species of small to medium-sized tree endemic to montane and eastern Australia. It has rough, fibrous and fissured bark on most of the trunk and smooth light brown to grey bark often shed in long ribbons on the branches. The adult leaves are lance-shaped to curved, the flower buds in groups of three and the fruit a conical or bell-shaped capsule.

Description
The bark on most of the trunk is rough, fibrous and finely and grey or brown-grey and on the branches is smooth, light brown to  pale grey, with long ribbons of shed bark. Flowering occurs from January to March and the flowers are white.

Taxonomy
Eucalyptus chapmaniana was first formally described in 1947 by Alexander Kenneth Cameron from a specimen near Bogong and the description was published in The Victorian Naturalist. The specific epithet (chapmanii) honours Wilfrid Chapman (1891–1955), after he had drawn attention to the existence of this species.

Distribution and habitat
Bogong gum grows in wet forest and grassy or shrubby woodland, often on steep slopes, in cold mountains areas of Victoria and far southeastern New South Wales. In Victoria it occurs along the highest parts of the Great Dividing Range between Jamieson and Benambra and is also found on Mount Buffalo and Pine Mountain. In New South Wales it is only found south of Khancoban.

Gallery

References

chapmaniana
Myrtales of Australia
Flora of New South Wales
Flora of Victoria (Australia)
Trees of Australia
Trees of mild maritime climate
Plants described in 1947